Léon Abel Provancher (born 10 March 1820, in the parish of Bécancour, Nicolet County, Quebec; d. at Cap-Rouge, Quebec, 23 March 1892) was a Canadian Catholic parish priest and naturalist. He is called the "Father of Natural History in Canada".

Life
Provancher studied at the College and Seminary of Nicolet, and was ordained 12 September 1844. He organized two pilgrimages to Jerusalem, one of which he conducted in person. In 1865 he established in his parish at Portneuf a confraternity of the Third Order of St. Francis. He promoted the Third Order in his writings. For two years he edited a review, in which he published nearly every month an article on the Third Order, or answered questions appertaining thereto.

From childhood he had a special love for the study of nature and whatever time he could spare from his pastoral duties was devoted to the study and description of the fauna and flora of Canada. Provancher specialized in botany and entomology. He started in the art of grafting and began collecting shellfish. The Léon-Provancher collection of specimens and writings constitute the most complete and best preserved collections of North American naturalists of the nineteenth century.

Works

In 1868 he founded the Naturaliste Canadien, a monthly publication which he edited for twenty years, and from 1869 until his death he was engaged almost exclusively in scientific work.

Among his chief writings are:

"Traité élémentaire de Botanique" (Quebec, 1858)
"Flore canadienne" (2 vols., Quebec, 1862)
"Le Verger Canadien" (Quebec, 1862); "Le Verger, le Potager et le Parterre" (Quebec, 1874)
"Faune entomologique du Canada" (3 vols., 1877–90)
"De Québec à Jérusalem" (1884)
"Une Excursion aux Climats tropicaux" (1890)
"Les Mollusques de la Province de Québec".

See also
List of Roman Catholic scientist-clerics

References 

Laflamme, Proceedings and Transactions of the Royal Society of Canada for 1892, Presidential Address (Ottawa, 1893)
Huard, L'Abbé Provancher in Le Naturaliste Canadien, XXI-XXVI, XXX (Chicoutimi, 1894-9; Quebec, 1903).

External links 

 
 the Catholic Encyclopedia
 Biography at the Dictionary of Canadian Biography Online

1820 births
1892 deaths
Canadian naturalists
19th-century Canadian botanists
Canadian entomologists
19th-century Canadian Roman Catholic priests
Catholic clergy scientists
People from Centre-du-Québec
Academic journal editors
Persons of National Historic Significance (Canada)